The Howerd Confessions is a British comedy television series which originally aired between 2 September and 7 October 1976 on ITV. It featured comedian Frankie Howerd "confessing" various indiscretions.

Each of the 6 episodes was a self-contained, untitled, playlet.

The director/producer was Michael Mills, with scripts by Dave Freeman, Dick Hills, Hugh Stuckey and Peter Robinson.

In 2021 the series was broadcast in the UK on the Freeview/Sky/Freesat channel That's TV Xmas UK.

Selected cast
 Frankie Howerd as Frankie [all episodes]
 Joan Sims as Nellie / Matron / Mrs Beachum [episodes 1, 3 and 4]
 Caroline Munro as Captain Latour [episode 2]
 Madeline Smith as Nurse [episode 3]
 John Junkin as Sergeant [episode 4]
 Linda Thorson as Eve [episode 5]
 Alfie Bass as Chalky White [episode 5]
 Alan Curtis as Sgt Hardman [episode 5]
 April Olrich as Deirdre [episode 6]
 Sarah Douglas as Lola [episode 6]
 Cyril Appleton as Sergeant [episode 2]

References

External links
 

1976 British television series debuts
1976 British television series endings
1970s British comedy television series
ITV sitcoms
Television shows produced by Thames Television